Sakhavat Mammadov (23 October 1953 – 30 September 1991) was an Azerbaijani mugham singer.

Death
On Monday, 30 September 1991, Sakhavat died in a motor vehicle accident. He couldn't be buried in his home village due Armenian occupation of Aghdam.

References

1953 births
1991 deaths
20th-century Azerbaijani male singers
People from Agdam
Mugham singers
Road incident deaths in Azerbaijan